Reverend Bruce W. Johnson Jr. (1938 – September 29, 1969) was a Methodist minister in the Lincoln Park neighborhood of Chicago, Illinois. He was pastor of Armitage Avenue United Methodist Church (renamed "People's Church") and worked closely with the Young Lords, a Puerto Rican civil rights organization and former street gang. Johnson and his wife Marjorie Eugenia Johnson (née Ransier) were found stabbed to death in their home on September 29, 1969.

Early life
Bruce Johnson was born in Aurora, Illinois in 1938. He met his wife Eugenia while they both attended Garrett–Evangelical Theological Seminary in Evanston, Illinois. The couple married in 1962 and had three sons, Brian, Kevin, and Perry. Johnson was ordained as a Methodist minister in 1964.

Involvement with the Young Lords
Johnson offered aid and solidarity to the Young Lords during their occupation of the McCormick Theological Seminary in May 1969. Soon after, the Young Lords approached officials at Armitage Avenue United Methodist Church, where Johnson was pastor, about setting up a day care center at the church. Johnson was receptive to the idea, but the congregation was not. After a four-day sit-in that began on June 11, 1969, the Young Lords occupied the church. Lincoln Park residents asked the city to inspect the church to determine if the site was in compliance with state regulations in hopes of quashing the day care project. The inspection found eleven violations that cost an estimated ten thousand dollars to correct. The Young Lords raised the funds, and two months later a day care center was opened in the basement of the church. A medical facility and breakfast program for poor children were added later.  Johnson supported the takeover of the church, which the Young Lords eventually renamed the "People's Church".

Death
Johnson and his wife were found stabbed to death in their apartment on September 29, 1969. Their murders  remain unsolved.

Legacy
Bruce Johnson and Eugenia Johnson continue to be recognized for their support of the Young Lords. On September 29, 2019, a service was held at Holy Covenant United Methodist Church to commemorate the fiftieth anniversary of the couple's deaths. Speakers at the service included Young Lords founder José Cha Cha Jiménez, DePaul University professor Jacqueline Lazu, and leaders from the Presbyterian McCormick Theological Seminary (occupied by the Young Lords in 1969). Following the memorial, attendees marched through the Lincoln Park neighborhood to the former site of People’s Church.

See also
Young Lords
José Cha Cha Jiménez
Rainbow Coalition (Fred Hampton)

References

External links
 Young Lords Newspaper Collection at DePaul University Library - Digital Collections
 Young Lords in Lincoln Park - Grand Valley State University Special Collections & University Archives
 Rainbow Coalition - Grand Valley State University Digital Collection
 National Young Lords

1938 births
1969 deaths
1969 murders in the United States
20th-century American clergy
20th-century Christians
20th-century Methodist ministers
American anti-racism activists
American United Methodist clergy
DePaul University Special Collections and Archives holdings
Unsolved murders in the United States